FC Etar Veliko Tarnovo is a former Bulgarian professional football club based in Veliko Tarnovo. They were last competing in the 2012–13 season of the Bulgarian A Professional Football Group, the top tier of professional football in Bulgaria. The club replaced the old FC Etar (Veliko Tarnovo), which won the Bulgarian championship in 1991.

The club's home ground has been Ivaylo Stadium since 1958, and their main nicknames are the Bolyars and the Violets, the latter in reference to the colour of their home kit, which is often mistaken for purple.

The club folded following the end of the 2012–13 A PFG due to financial difficulties. Etar Veliko Tarnovo acquired the license of Botev Debelets and played in the Bulgarian V AFG in the 2013/14 season.

Honours

Domestic
Bulgarian East B PFG
Winners (1): 2011–12
Bulgarian North-West V AFG
Winners (1): 2002–03

History

The club was founded as Etar 1924 in 2002. In their first season, they were promoted to B PFG as champions of the North-West V AFG.

In the 2004–05 season Etar had their best Bulgarian Cup run, beating Dorostol Silistra and Slavia Sofia before losing to Levski Sofia in the Round of 16.

In September 2010, Velin Kefalov had been appointed as a manager of Etar 1924. He led the team to the third place in the West B PFG. Because Chernomorets Pomorie did not receive licence to play in the A PFG, Etar competed in the promotion playoff, but lost 3–1 to Svetkavitsa.

In June 2011, Kefalov left the club and was replaced by Georgi Todorov in the role of head coach. Todorov resigned after the first half of the 2011–12 season and was replaced by Tsanko Tsvetanov. А streak of good form in the second half of the season, ensured promotion to the A PFG on 23 May 2012 with 1–0 home win against Nesebar. The team finished the autumn part of the 2012/2013 A PFG in last place of the standings. As a result, the second half of the 2012/13 A PFG season saw a huge turnover in player and managerial personnel (Tsvetanov had already been replaced by Serdar Dayat). Despite a bright start to the spring season, the increasing financial uncertainty continued to plague the team and Etar relocated to Sliven, in part due to a conflict of interest with the Veliko Tarnovo supporter groups and the municipality, which contributed to the club remaining in the relegation zone. In May 2013, the team was practically dissolved and Etar's remaining A PFG opponents were awarded 3:0 wins by default until the end of the season.

Last squad

Foreign players
Up to three non-EU nationals can be registered and given a squad number for the first team in the A PFG. Those non-EU nationals with European ancestry can claim citizenship from the nation their ancestors came from. If a player does not have European ancestry he can claim Bulgarian citizenship after playing in Bulgaria for 5 years.

Managerial history
This is a list of the last seven Etar managers:

As of 8 May 2013

References

External links
 Official Website
 Website of the Etar supporters
 News about the team and sport in Veliko Tarnovo region

Etar 1924 Veliko Tarnovo
Association football clubs established in 2002
2002 establishments in Bulgaria
Etar 1924 Veliko Tarnovo
Football clubs in Veliko Tarnovo

2013 disestablishments in Bulgaria